This is a list of diplomatic missions in Mauritania. There are currently 32 embassies in Nouakchott.

Embassies in Nouakchott

Other posts 
 (Delegation)

Consulates General

Nouakchott

Nouadhibou

Non-resident embassies 

If not mentioned, then the residence is in Rabat.

 (Madrid)
 (Tunis)
 (Paris)
 
 
 
 (Dakar)
 
 (Algiers)
 
 (Algiers)
 (Tripoli)
 
 
 
 (Paris)
 
 (Dublin)
 (Dakar)

 (Paris)
 (Dakar)
 (London)
 (Tripoli)
 (London)
 (Valletta)
  
 (Algiers)
 
 (Dakar)
 (Abuja)
 
 (Dakar)

 (Dakar)
 (Rabat)
 (New York City)
 (Tripoli)
 (Dakar)
 
 (Bamako)

 (Paris)
 (Paris)
 (Abuja)

 (Paris)

Former Embassies 
 (closed in 2009)

See also 
 Foreign relations of Mauritania
 List of diplomatic missions of Mauritania

References
 Embassy of Mauritania in Washington DC

 
Mauritania
Diplomatic missions